In molecular biology, and more importantly high-throughput DNA sequencing, a chimera is a single DNA sequence originating when multiple transcripts or DNA sequences get joined. It can occur in various contexts. Chimeric reads are generally considered artifacts in sequencing applications (such as amplicon sequencing) and are filtered out from the data during processing  to prevent spurious inferences of biological variation. In a different context, the deliberate creation of artificial chimeras can also be a useful tool in the molecular biology. For example, in protein engineering, "chimeragenesis (forming chimeras between proteins that are encoded by homologous cDNAs)" is one of the "two major techniques used to manipulate cDNA sequences". For gene fusions that occur through natural processes, see chimeric genes and fusion genes.

Description

Transcript chimera 
A chimera can occur as a single cDNA sequence originating from two transcripts. It is usually considered to be a contaminant in transcript and expressed sequence tag (which results in the moniker of EST chimera) databases. It is estimated that approximately 1% of all transcripts in the National Center for Biotechnology Information's Unigene database contain a "chimeric sequence".

PCR chimera 
A chimera can also be an artifact of PCR amplification. It occurs when the extension of an amplicon is aborted, and the aborted product functions as a primer in the next PCR cycle. The aborted product anneals to the wrong template and continues to extend, thereby synthesizing a single sequence sourced from two different templates.

PCR chimeras are an important issue to take into account during metabarcoding, where DNA sequences from environmental samples are used to determine biodiversity. A chimera is a novel sequence that will most probably not match to any known organism. Hence, it might be interpreted as a new species thereby overinflating the diversity.

Chimeric read 
A chimeric read is a digital DNA sequence (i.e. a string of letters in a file that can be read as a DNA sequence) that originates from an actual chimera (i.e. a physical DNA sequence in a sample) or produced due to misreading the sample. The latter is known to occur with sequencing of electrophoresis gels. Chimeric reads are common with amplicon sequencing applications such as 16S rRNA gene sequencing, since closely related sequences are amplified. The most common mechanism is that incomplete extension during the PCR results in partial sequence strands that can act as primers in subsequent PCR cycles on similar but non identical sequences. Extension of such hybrid priming events causes the formation of chimeric sequences.

Some computational methods have been devised to detect and remove chimeras, like:

 CHECK_CHIMERA of the Ribosomal Database Project  
 ChimeraSlayer in QIIME
 uchime in usearch
 removeBimeraDenovo() in dada2 
 Bellerophon
 CATCh
 DECIPHER

Examples 
 "The first mRNA transcript isolated for..." the human gene C2orf3 "...was part of an artificial chimera..."
 CYP2C17 was thought to be a human gene, but "...is now considered an artefact based on a chimera of CYP2C18 and CYP2C19."
 Researchers have created receptor chimeras in their studies of Oncostatin M.

See also 

 Ribosome
 Transgene
 Trans-splicing
 Chimera (genetics)
 chimeric gene
 fusion gene

References 

Genetics